Isopeda villosa is a species of huntsman spider native to New South Wales, Australia, and established in Auckland, New Zealand. It was first described by Ludwig Carl Christian Koch in 1875.

Gallery

References

Sparassidae
Fauna of New South Wales
Spiders of Australia
Spiders described in 1875